Arab Minifootball Federation (AMF); is a governing body that supervises Arab federations under World Minifootball Federation.

The organization consists of 22 Arab countries, all of which are official members of the Arab League.

History

Arab Minifootball Federation (AMF) was established in 2017 in Beirut, Lebanon.

On May 20, 2017, a constituent general assembly was held in presence of delegations from five countries: Lebanon, Tunisia, Libya, Iraq and Somalia.

Lebanese Ahmed Dench was chosen as the president of Arab Minifootball Federation (AMF), Libyan Hassan Talib as the deputy president, and granted membership of Lebanese Mahmoud Al-Nador, Lebanese Bilal Yazbek, Tunisian Moez bin Salem and Somali Abadi Ahmed.

In 2020, the headquarters of Arab Minifootball Federation (AMF) were moved to Cairo, Egypt. a
Egyptian Ahmed Samir Suleiman was elected president of the association.

Presidents

Competitions

On December 25, 2019, the Egyptian Ministry of Youth and Sports issued a decision to organize first Arab Nation Minifootball Cup in 2020.

Arab Minifootball Federation has set the date for February 28, 2020, and Olympic Center Minifootball Stadium in Cairo to host the tournament.

The first group consisted of Egypt, Algeria, Somalia and Lebanon, while second group consisted of Tunisia, Djibouti, Saudi Arabia and Iraq. The sphinx was also chosen to be mascot of the tournament.

However, the start has been postponed to another date due to COVID-19 pandemic.

International competitions participation
Legend
  

 — African Minifootball Federation teams
 — Asian Minifootball Federation teams

 — Champions
 — Runners-up
 — Third place
 — Fourth place
QF — Quarterfinals (knockout round of 8)
R2 — Round 2 (knockout round of 16)
R1 — Round 1 (first group stage)

Q — Qualified for upcoming tournament
 — Qualified but withdrew
 — Did not qualify
 — Did not enter / Withdrew / Banned / Entry not accepted by WMF
 — Hosts
 — Not affiliated to WMF

WMF World Cup

WMF Continental Cup

WMF World Cup U-23

WMF Women’s World Cup

African Minifootball Cup

Club competitions participation

African Minifootball Champions League

See also
World Minifootball Federation

References

Minifootball
Sports organizations established in 2017
Arab organizations
International sports organizations